Kaja  was a newspaper published in Estonia between 1919 and 1935.

Defunct newspapers published in Estonia
Newspapers published in Estonia